Johannes Amundsson Aarflot (29 October 1824 – 3 November 1891) was a Norwegian businessman and member of the Norwegian Parliament.

Aarflot was born on the farm Årflot at Ørsta (Aarflot i Ørsta) in Møre og Romsdal, Norway. He was the son of Amund Knutsson Aarflot (1788–1860) and his wife, Berte Canutte Aarflot (1795–1859) who was a Christian hymnwriter in the Haugean tradition (haugianere). From 1841 he was an employee at a bookstore in Aalesund. In 1860, he opened his own bookstore, Aarflots Bokhandel (now Ark Aarflot).

He was a member of the city council in Ålesund during 1861. He served as the mayor of the town in 1864, 1876–81 and 1883–91.  He also served as one of the Settlement Commissioners (Forlikskommissær) on the District Conciliation Board (Forliksråd ) from 1870. Aarflot became a member of the Norwegian Parliament from the Conservative Party, representing Aalesund og Molde during four terms (1868-1869, 1871–1873, 1880–82, 1889–1891).

References

Other sources

1824 births
1891 deaths
People from Møre og Romsdal
Norwegian businesspeople
Mayors of places in Møre og Romsdal
Conservative Party (Norway) politicians
Members of the Storting